Arthur Ernest Cook (6 September 1883 – 10 April 1945) was an Australian politician.
He was born in Sandhurst to engine driver Robert Cook and Mary Daley. He attended state school before becoming a hairdresser, owning his own business in Bendigo from around 1901. On 28 April 1909 he married Mary Victoria Rocke, with whom he had four children. He served as vice-president of the Bendigo Trades Hall Council and was on the Labor Party's state executive from 1916 to 1918. In 1924 he was elected to the Victorian Legislative Assembly as the Labor member for Bendigo West, transferring to Bendigo in 1927. He served until his death at Parliament House in Melbourne in 1945. One of his grandsons, Esmond Curnow, later served in the Assembly.

References

1883 births
1945 deaths
Australian Labor Party members of the Parliament of Victoria
Members of the Victorian Legislative Assembly
20th-century Australian politicians